In software, an XML pipeline is formed when XML (Extensible Markup Language) processes, especially XML transformations and XML validations, are connected.

For instance, given two transformations T1 and T2, the two can be connected so that an input XML document is transformed by T1 and then the output of T1 is fed as input document to T2. Simple pipelines like the one described above are called linear; a single input document always goes through the same sequence of transformations to produce a single output document.

Linear operations 
Linear operations can be divided in at least two parts

Micro-operations 
They operate at the inner document level
 Rename - renames elements or attributes without modifying the content
 Replace - replaces elements or attributes
 Insert - adds a new data element to the output stream at a specified point
 Delete - removes an element or attribute (also known as pruning the input tree)
 Wrap - wraps elements with additional elements
 Reorder - changes the order of elements

Document operations 
They take the input document as a whole
 Identity transform - makes a verbatim copy of its input to the output
 Compare - it takes two documents and compare them
 Transform - execute a transform on the input file using a specified XSLT file.  Version 1.0 or 2.0 should be specified.
 Split - take a single XML document and split it into distinct documents

Sequence operations 
They are mainly introduced in XProc and help to handle the sequence of document as a whole
 Count - it takes a sequence of documents and counts them
 Identity transform - makes a verbatim copy of its input sequence of documents to the output
 split-sequence - takes a sequence of documents as input and routes them to different outputs depending on matching rules
 wrap-sequence - takes a sequence of documents as input and wraps them into one or more documents

Non-linear 

Non-linear operations on pipelines may include:

 Conditionals — where a given transformation is executed if a condition is met while another transformation is executed otherwise
 Loops — where a transformation is executed on each node of a node set selected from a document or a transformation is executed until a condition evaluates to false
 Tees — where a document is fed to multiple transformations potentially happening in parallel
 Aggregations — where multiple documents are aggregated into a single document
 Exception Handling — where failures in processing can result in an alternate pipeline being processed

Some standards also categorize transformation as macro (changes impacting an entire file) or micro (impacting only an element or attribute)

XML pipeline languages 

XML pipeline languages are used to define pipelines. A program written with an XML pipeline language is implemented by software known as an XML pipeline engine, which creates processes, connects them together and finally executes the pipeline. Existing XML pipeline languages include:

Standards 
 XProc: An XML Pipeline Language is a W3C Recommendation  for defining linear and non-linear XML pipelines.

Product-specific 
 W3C XML Pipeline Definition Language is specified in a W3C Note.
 W3C XML Pipeline Language (XPL) Version 1.0 (Draft)  is specified in a W3C Submission and a component of Orbeon Presentation Server OPS (now called Orbeon Forms).  This specification provides an implementation of an earlier version of the language.  XPL allows the declaration of complex pipelines with conditionals, loops, tees, aggregations, and sub-pipelines. XProc is roughly a superset of XPL.
 Cocoon sitemaps allow, among other functionality, the declaration of XML pipelines. Cocoon sitemaps are one of the earliest implementations of the concept of XML pipeline.
 smallx XML Pipelines are used by the smallx project.
 ServingXML defines a vocabulary for expressing flat-XML, XML-flat, flat-flat, and XML-XML transformations in pipelines.
 PolarLake Circuit Markup Language used by PolarLake's runtime to define XML pipelines. Circuits are collections of paths through which fragments of XML stream (usually as SAX or DOM events). Components are placed on paths to interact with the stream (and/or the outside world) in a low latency process.
 xmlsh is a scripting language based on the unix shells which natively supports xml and text pipelines 
 Stylus Studio XML Pipeline is a visual grammar which defines the following operations: Input, Output, XQuery, XSLT, Validate, XSL-FO to PDF, Convert To XML, Convert From XML, Choose, Warning, Stop.

Pipe granularity 
Different XML Pipeline implementations support different granularity of flow.

 Document: Whole documents flow through the pipe as atomic units. A document can only be in one place at a time. Though usually multiple documents may be in the pipe at once.
 Event: Element/Text nodes events may flow through different paths. A document may be concurrently flowing through many components at the same time.

Standardization 

Until May 2010, there was no widely used standard for XML pipeline languages.  However, with the introduction of the W3C XProc standard as a W3C Recommendation as of May 2010, widespread adoption can be expected.

History 

 1972 Douglas McIlroy of Bell Laboratories adds the pipe operator to the UNIX command shell.  This allows the output from one shell program to go directly into input of another shell program without going to disk.  This allowed programs such as the UNIX awk and sed to be specialized yet work together .  For more details see Pipeline (Unix).
 1993 Sean McGrath developed a C++ toolkit for SGML processing.
 1998 Stefano Mazzocchi releases the first version of Apache Cocoon, one of the first software programs to use XML pipelines.
 1998 PolarLake build XML Operating System, which includes XML Pipelining.
 2002 Notes submitted by Norman Walsh and Eve Maler from Sun Microsystems, as well as a W3C Submission submitted in 2005 by Erik Bruchez and Alessandro Vernet from Orbeon, were important steps toward spawning an actual standardization effort. While neither submission directly became a W3C recommendation, they were considered key sources of inspiration for the W3C XML Processing Working Group.
 September 2005 W3C XML Processing Working Group started. The task of this working group was to create a specification for an XML pipelining language.
 August 2008, xmlsh, an XML pipeline language was announced at Balisage 2008

See also 
 Apache Cocoon
 Identity transform
 NetKernel
 Pipeline (Unix)
 W3C recommendation
 XSLT

References

External links

Standards

Recommendations 
 XProc: An XML Pipeline Language, W3C Recommendation 11 May 2010

Working drafts 
 W3C XML Processing Model Working Group
 W3C XML Pipeline Definition Language Note
 W3C XML Pipeline Language (XPL) Version 1.0 (Draft) Submission

Product specific 

 XProc tutorial and reference
 Oracle's XML Pipeline Definition Language Controller Implementation Part of XML Developer's kit, no individual download
 Cocoon sitemap
 NetKernel XML Pipelines
 Managing Complex Document Generation through Pipelining
 XML Pipeline Language (XPL) Documentation
 SXPipe
 PolarLake Reference data management PolarLake XML circuits and reference data management
 smallx
 ServingXML
 XML Pipeline Implementation from Stylus Studio - This program allows XML transforms to be chained together along with other operations on XML files such as validation and HTML Tidy.
 IVI XML Pipeline Server XML Pipeline Server is an implementation for the Stylus Studio XML Pipeline language
 Norman Walsh's XProc web site - Norman Walsh is the chair of the W3C XProc standards committee.
 yax - an XProc Implementation currently with commandline and Apache ant interface
 Yahoo! Pipes let's users create multi-source data mashups in a web-based visual environment
 xmlsh A shell for manipulating xml based on the unix shells. Supports in-process multithreaded xml and text processing pipelines.
  How to implement XML Pipeline in XSLT
 Calabash is an implementation of XProc
 Calumet is an XProc implementation from EMC
 QuiXProc is an XProc implementation of Innovimax

XML-based standards
Inter-process communication